Richard A. Friesner is an American theoretical chemist and William P. Schweitzer Professor of Chemistry at Columbia University. He was elected to the American Academy of Arts and Sciences in 2008, and the National Academy of Sciences in 2016.  Richard Friesner co-founded Schrödinger in 1990.

References

External links
 Official site at Columbia University

1952 births
Living people
21st-century American chemists
Columbia University faculty
Computational chemists
Fellows of the American Academy of Arts and Sciences
Members of the United States National Academy of Sciences